Peter Charley is a U.S-based journalist, documentary film maker, television producer and author.

Early life and education
His father, Philip Nivison Charley  was the son of Sir Philip Belmont Charley and grandson of Major Philip Charley, one of the ‘Syndicate of Seven’ who founded Broken Hill Proprietary Ltd in 1883. In 2018, BHP's revenue was estimated to be 43.64 billion. Charley spent his teenage years at boarding school in Australia and in Papua New Guinea where his family was based in Goroka, Madang and Port Moresby. In 1973, he was invited to accompany a medical expedition into the remote Eastern Highlands of Papua New Guinea to investigate an outbreak of the fatal brain disorder ‘kuru’, caused by ritualistic cannibalism.

Charley attended The Scots School, Albury, and Newington College, in Sydney. He studied communications at New York University and holds a master's degree in media practice from The University of Sydney. At Harvard University, Charley studied Central Challenges of American National Security, Strategy and the Press (via Ed-X). Charley undertook European studies at the European Academy in Berlin and studied Spanish Language at Escuela Dinámico in Antigua, Guatemala, and Spanish Language and Latin American Culture at the Academia de Español in Quito, Ecuador.

Journalism career
Charley began his career as a reporter on The Sydney Morning Herald and the Sydney Sun newspapers in Australia where he worked as a general news reporter, feature writer and music critic. He later worked as an on-air news and current affairs reporter and producer at the Seven Network in Australia before moving to New York, where he worked as Associate Producer at Sixty Minutes, Channel Nine, and as a reporter for National Public Radio.

Charley traveled extensively throughout Central and South America, covering conflict and civil unrest in El Salvador, Nicaragua, Guatemala, Honduras, Mexico, Peru, Ecuador, Chile, Bolivia, Argentina, Paraguay, Uruguay and Brazil.

Charley's coverage of conflict also included unrest in Syria, Cambodia's fight against the Khmer Rouge, East Timor's struggle for independence, the Bougainville war, unrest in South Africa, Libya and the Los Angeles riots.

In 1986, Charley was appointed Show Producer of the weekly, current affairs program, The Reporters, produced by Fox Television, New York.

Between 2000 and 2007, Charley worked as Executive Producer of the ABC TV's flagship news program, Lateline. He then joined Australia's SBS television as Executive Producer of the international current affairs program, Dateline – a position he held for seven years. In 2014, he left Dateline to take up the role of Senior Executive Producer of Al Jazeera's North American investigative unit, based in Washington, DC.

At Al Jazeera, Charley was responsible for producing, writing and reporting the controversial two-part series 'How to Sell a Massacre' which involved a three-year undercover infiltration of the National Rifle Association of America. The program led to the resignation of 'Pauline Hanson's One Nation' Senate candidate Steve Dickson after secretly-recorded video showed Dickson and One Nation's Chief of Staff James Ashby meeting with officials from the NRA and with representatives of Koch Industries in Washington, DC. In 2019, Charley was approached by HarperCollins to write a book on the making of the documentary series. The book, 'How to Sell a Massacre - One Nation, the US gun lobby and $20 million - inside journalism's most audacious sting', was published in August 2020, reaching an Amazon ranking of Number One Best Seller under the categories of Federal Jurisdiction Law, Conventional Weapons and Warfare History, Political Freedom, Journalism & Nonfiction Writing Reference, and Radical Political Thought.

Charley has twice been invited by the International Academy of Television Arts and Sciences to participate as Juror for the International Emmy Awards competition to judge international television programming.

Awards

Published works

Books

Video

References

Further reading

 

Year of birth missing (living people)
Living people
People from Deniliquin
Australian emigrants to the United States
American male journalists
People educated at Newington College
University of Sydney alumni
New York University alumni
Harvard University alumni
21st-century Australian journalists
Australian investigative journalists